The Nautical Archaeological Association of South Australia (NAASA) was an amateur maritime archaeology organisation which was founded in 1982 by individuals who resigned from the Society for Underwater Historical Research (SUHR) in April 1982 following a dispute.  The association is believed to have ceased operation in the early 1990s.

Naming Controversy
The newly formed Association had proposed to be known as the Maritime Archaeology Association of South Australia.<ref>‘Minutes of the General Meeting held … on Tuesday 25 May 1982’ in SUHR Newsletter for May 1982 in Cowan, David (editor); (2007), The Society for Underwater Historical Research – Publications 1974-2004.</</ref>  However, the SUHR quickly altered its official name to The Society for Underwater Historical Research (Maritime Archaeology Association of South Australia) Incorporated to prevent this action.  The reason given by the SUHR for its action was that it ‘has been known interstate as the Maritime Archaeology Association of South Australia for some years.'

HMS Buffalo wreck site discovery

References

Archaeological organizations
1982 establishments in Australia